Djoliba Athletic Club is a Malian football club and one of the two biggest teams in Mali alongside the Stade Malien. The team is based in the capital city of Bamako. It has its headquarters and three training stadia at Complex Sportif Hérémakono, in the Heremakono Quartier. The President of Djoliba AC, re-elected in 2009 to a four-year term, is Karounga Keita a Vice President of the Malian Football Federation, former trainer at the club, who was a player at the founding of the club in 1960. Djoliba or Joliba is the name of the Niger River in the Bamana language.  Not only a football club, Djoliba AC is an Omnisports club which fields teams in many sports, and is operated as a membership organisation with an elected board.

History
The club was created in 1960 by a fusion of "Africa Sport" Bamako and "Foyer du Soudan", two successful teams during French Colonial rule.

The team was helped a lot during the 1970s by officer Tiécoro Bagayoko, a prominent member of the ruling military dictatorship of president Moussa Traoré. Many critics of Djoliba AC, especially coming from the rival Stade Malien, claim that the strength of the club was built during that period.

However, Tiekoro Bagayoko was gone in 1978 after his arrest, yet Djoliba kept obtaining titles and cups. Today, it is reputed to be the biggest and the most organized soccer club in Mali.

Malien Première Division 2007/08
2008 was a year of great success for Djoliba, having finished the year before in second place to their cross town rivals, Djoliba handily took the cup and league double in 2008. Reigning champions from the 2007 Malien Première Division, Stade and Djoliba sat atop the standings the entire season, with Djoliba leading by a small but consistent margin in the run up to the final games.  Their 7 July derby match was postponed to August, and although they lost this match their rivals, Stade faltered where Djoliba were consistent, finishing the season 9 points ahead of Stade. The only Cup meeting between the two rivals in the season was in the Semi-finals of the Malien Cup, where Stade faced the humiliation of a 5–0 drubbing by Djoliba.

Bamako District Mayor's Cup
Djoliba's one failure came at the end of the season, losing the "Coupe du Maire du District": the Bamako District Mayor's Cup to arch rivals Stade Malien. But while Stade made it to the final, its victory over Djoliba came from legal, rather than on the field factors.  In the 44th minute of the match, Djoliba supporters rioted, attacking officials, other fans, and journalists.  The match was called off, and several days later, awarded to Stade. Djoliba were fined 500.000 F cfa, all payments for previous matches were withdrawn, and they were excluded form the 2009 competition. Stade received the trophy and a 750,000 F Cfa award from the Mayor of Bamako Adama Sangaré on 23 September.

2008/09 Season
Djoliba competed in 2008–09 Malian Première Division, beginning in December 2008. They began the season successfully, taking the Super Coupe National du Mali on 6 December against Club Olympique de Bamako 5–2. The Super Coupe launches the regular schedule by pitting the previous years' League and Cup winners. As Djoliba won both, they faced last years' Coupe du Mali runner up, COB.

Djoliba AC today
In 2010, Djoliba celebrated its 50th anniversary of the merger and foundation of the club.

Their last championship win was in 2012 and their last super cup win was in 2013.

Djoliba appeared at group stage in the 2012 CAF Confederation Cup, they challenged with AC Léopards of the Republic of the Congo, Morocco's WAC Casablanca and brought Mali's largest rivalry to the cup competition, Stade Malien, Djoliba defeat that club in two matches.  Djoliba advanced to the semis and defeated a Sudanese club and challenged with AC Léopard's in the finals and lost to that club, there, they made the greatest position in the continental competitions for Djoliba.

In the 2017 season, Djoliba was 8th place and had two wins and a draw and had seven points before the abandonment as FEMAFOOT was dissolved by the government mainly by an undetermined reason on 9 March, over a week later, FIFA suspended the Malian Football Federation on 17 March which meant all Malian clubs competing at the continental level were banned until 7 May.  The reason was that money that the Ministry of Sport gave to the clubs.  The least problem of the

Djoliba appeared in the 2017 CAF Confederation Cup and faced Egypt's al-Masry. Djoliba defeated that club 2–0, as a result of the March 2017 dissolution by the government, al-Masry was awarded against Djoliba 0–3 in the away match somewhere on 18 March.  The season was halted and in early May, the Federation was restored, their next challenge would be with Kita, that 6th round match is on hold.  Their first challenge since the restoration was on 8 May, a 7th round match where the club defeated Black Stars 0–5 in Badalabougou.

Stadium
Djoliba plays at Stade 26 Mars.  The club trains at Complex Sportif Hérémakono, in the Heremakono Quartier.

Rivalries
Its rivalry is with Stade Malien forming the nation's largest rivalry known as the Grand Derby. Real Bamako is Djoliba's other rivalry being called the Bamako Derby and the nation's second largest.

Honours
 Malien Première Division: 23
 1966, 1967, 1968, 1971, 1973, 1974, 1975, 1976, 1979, 1982, 1985, 1988, 1990, 1992, 1996, 1997, 1998, 1999, 2004, 2008, 2009, 2012, 2021–22.

 Malien Cup: 20
 1965, 1971, 1973, 1974, 1975, 1976, 1977, 1978, 1979, 1981, 1983, 1993, 1996, 1998, 2003, 2004, 2007, 2008, 2009, 2022.

 Super Coupe National du Mali: 7 
 1993, 1994, 1997, 1999, 2008, 2012, 2013.

League and cup history

Performance in CAF competitions

1Invincible Eleven withdrew
2 The match was finished 2-0 in favour of Djoliba, ASFA refused to play the penalty shootout due to arbitration, they were to be banned from CAF competitions for three years, no ban was put as ASFA Dakar participated the following season after winning their second championship title
3Djoliba was disqualified for not paying their debts to the CAF
4FIFA suspended the Malian Football Federation on 17 March 2017 which meant all Malian clubs such as Djoliba were banned from participating in African football competitions, in early May, the suspension has been lifted.
5Djoliba won on walkover after ELWA United withdrew.

WAFU Club Championship

National level

Statistics
Best position: Semifinals (continental)
Best position at cup competitions: Finalist (continental)

Squad
as of 8 April 2014

Head coach
  Abderrazak Chlih

Notable players

 Vincent Traoré
 Koffi Pascal N'Guessan
 Bourahama Sidibé
 Issa Nabioul N’Diaye
 Guillaume Traoré
 Ibrahima Bangoura Olyssé (eight caps for the Guinea national football team)
 Almamy Camara
 Sedonoude Janvier Abouta
 Salif Coulibaly
 Moussa Nesta Diallo
 Kalilou Doumbia
 Mohamed Oumar Konaté (Ivorian born former Malian U-20 national football team player)
 Boubacar Koné
 Sékou Rafan Sidibé
 Idrissa Traoré
 Issa Traoré
 Mahamane Cissé (three caps for the Niger national football team and former Malian U-20 national team member)
 Ousmane Cissé
 Yahaya Coulibaly
 Bourahama Sidibé

References

Other references
Mali – List of Champions Rec.Sport.Soccer Statistics Foundation, retrieved 2008-03-04.
Mali – List of Cup Winners Rec.Sport.Soccer Statistics Foundation, retrieved 2008-03-04.
Djoliba AC : C'est OK pour Darou. l'Essor n°15903 du – 2007-02-28

External links
championnat du Mali Djoliba Ac
les aigles du mali
football malien

 
Association football clubs established in 1960
Football clubs in Mali
Sport in Bamako
1960 establishments in Mali